Dorkrockcorkrod is the debut full-length album by The Ergs!. Originally released in 2004, in 2017 Rolling Stone listed it as #34 on their "50 Greatest Pop-Punk Albums" list. The album was released on CD on Whoa Oh Records. It's vinyl pressing on Don Giovanni Records would be that label's first full length release.

Track listing
All songs written by Mike Yannich except where noted.

"First Song, Side One" – 0:21
"A Very Pretty Song For A Very Special Young Lady Part 2" – 1:46
"Extra Medium" (Joe Keller) – 2:05
"Fishbulb" (Jeff Schroek) – 2:14 
"Most Violent Rap Group" – 1:24
"Pray For Rain" – 2:21
"Saturday Nite Crap-O-Rama" – 2:13
"Running, Jumping, Standing Still" – 2:23
"It's Never Going To Be The Same Again" (Joe Keller) – 2:30 
"August 19th" – 2:22
"Maybe I'm The New Messiah" (Rick Mayall, Jeff Schroek) – 0:26 
"Rod Argent" – 2:18
"Everything Falls Apart... And More" – 3:02
"Vampire Party" (Paul Roessler) – 2:31 
"I Feel Better Tonight" (Jeff Schroek) – 1:54 
"180° Emotional Ollie" – 5:32

Personnel
The Ergs
Mike Yannich – lead vocals, drums, percussion, rhythm guitar
Jeff Schroek – lead and rhythm guitars, lead vocals on tracks 4 and 15
Joe Keller – bass, Rik Mayall imitation on track 11

Additional personnel
Christopher Pierce– backing vocals on track 2, production, mixing
Tim Naumann– hardcore credibility on track 11
Alan Douches– mastering

References

2004 albums
The Ergs! albums
Don Giovanni Records albums